Huaynaccapac (possibly from in the Quechua spelling Wayna Qhapaq; wayna young, young man, qhapaq the mighty one, "the young mighty one", Hispanicized spellings Huayna Capac, Huaynaccapac, Huaynacapac) is a mountain in the Andes of Peru. Huaynaccapac is located in the Puno Region, Carabaya Province, north or northeast to east of Allincapac, the highest mountain of the range.

References

Mountains of Peru
Mountains of Puno Region